Be Mbitious is a South Korean dance survival program that premiered on Mnet on May 24, 2022. It is the first part of the male counterpart of Street Woman Fighter, and prequel to Street Man Fighter. The purpose of the show is to create a dance crew with male solo dancers to compete on Street Man Fighter. The new crew will be named Mbitious.

Cast 
The program is presented by Rain. The dance judges are:
Leejung (YGX)
Gabee (LACHICA)
Hyojin Choi (WANT)
Noze (WAYB)
Rihey (CocaNButter)
Prowdmon (Monika, Lip J)
Honey J (HolyBang)
Aiki (HOOK)
Kiel Tutin

Special Guests

Audition Evaluators (Episode 1) 
 Bae Yoon-jung
 Poppin' Hyun Joon
 Lip J
 Ha Hwi-dong
 Kwak Gwi-hoon
 Ha Woo-shin

Dance Instructors (Episode 1)
HolyBang (Jane, Hertz)
LACHICA (Peanut, H-1, Simeez)

Contestants 
A total of 458 participants applied to the program. Only 40 were selected by special evaluators to compete in the program. Notable applicants who did not make the cut are Kim Samuel, B.A.P's Jong-up and Zelo, DKB's Hee-chan, and WetBoy.

Missions

Mission 1: Hey Mama Choreography Copy Mission 
Contestants must learn and memorize two choreographies of "Hey Mama" by David Guetta created by Street Woman Fighter crews HolyBang and LACHICA. Contestants will then dance these choreographies back to back starting with HolyBang's choreography in groups of three to be evaluated by HolyBang and LACHICA. Each crew will then give each contestant either a "Respect" ranking or "Retry" ranking. A contestant must receive a "Respect" ranking from both crews to be able to pass the mission and be labeled a "RESPECT" dancer. "RESPECT" dancers may choose any non-"RESPECT" dancer as their opponent for the next round and label them as "NO RESPECT" dancers. If a contestant receives at least one "Retry" ranking, they must go back to the main area and try again. Contestants can only attempt to be evaluated twice. If a contestant receives a "Retry" Ranking on their second attempt, they are automatically labelled a "NO RESPECT" dancer. If a contestant goes to be evaluated and they have been chosen as a "NO RESPECT" dancer, they cannot be evaluated and must leave the evaluation room. This mission ends when 20 contestants pass as "RESPECT" dancers or when the time limit of 3 hours is over.

Mission 2: 1 on 1 Battle Evaluation 
Each "RESPECT" dancer calls out their chosen "NO RESPECT" dancer. They will compete in a one on one battle with the winner advancing to the next round. The one on one battle consists of two parts, a choreography section and a freestyle section. For the choreography section, the "RESPECT" dancer will create a choreography to "SMF" by Changmo (Prod. Czaer) and then teach their opposing "NO RESPECT" dancer. Both dancers will then compete after some time of practice and will be evaluated by the dance judges. The dance judges will vote on who will advance to the next round, with the advancing contestants receiving an "IN". Each round will either have one or both contestants receiving an "OUT". A total of 20 contestants will be eliminated.

Color key:
  IN
  OUT

Final Results 
The final crew, Mbitious, will consist of 8 members. The members will be chosen through evaluation by a crew selection committee combined with an online popular vote.

The Crew Selection Committee can award up to 600 points.
The voting period is from June 1, 2022 after the airing of the third episode to June 4, 2022 at 23:59 KST.  Scores are calculated as Views + Likes X 100. Contestants are ranked from this score and awarded points starting at 400 points for the highest score.

Final scores are calculated as the sum of the Crew Selection Committee's Score + Global Popular Vote Score

The final results were announces on the one-episode television special Be the SMF.

Numbers in bold for each score category denotes the top 8 highest scores.

Viewership

Sequel

Be the SMF 
Be the SMF is a one-episode television special that preceded Street Man Fighter and aired on July 5, 2022. It announced the final eight members who will jointly make up the 'Mbitious' crew on SMF. It also revealed the 8 crews participating in Street Man Fighter.

Street Man Fighter 
In the final of Street Dance Girls Fighter on January 4, 2022, Mnet Drops 1st Teaser and confirmed "Street Man Fighter" where male dance crews fight for the position of Korea's best male dance crew to represent K-Dance to be released in August 2022.

Notes

References

External links 
 

2022 South Korean television series debuts
Dance competition television shows
South Korean game shows
Korean-language television shows
Mnet (TV channel) original programming
2022 South Korean television series endings